Gautami Kapoor (born Gautami Gadgil) is an Indian television and film actress and model. She is well known for playing the role of Jaya in Kehta Hai Dil on Star Plus. She also gained popularity playing the lead in TV drama Ghar Ek Mandir and more recently in Parvarrish - Season 2 on Sony TV. She has also acted in many Marathi Movies.

Personal life

Kapoor is married to her Ghar Ek Mandir co-star and actor Ram Kapoor. They met on the sets of the TV show Ghar Ek Mandir and dated for a while before tying the knot on Valentine's Day in 2003. They have two children.

Filmography

Television

Films

Awards

References

External links 

Living people
Indian television actresses
Indian soap opera actresses
Indian film actresses
Actors from Mumbai
Year of birth missing (living people)